The United States Department of Defense acknowledges holding five Turkish captives in Guantanamo.
A total of 778 captives have been held in extrajudicial detention in the Guantanamo Bay detention camps, in Cuba since the camps opened on January 11, 2002,
The camp population peaked in 2004 at approximately 660.  Only nineteen new captives, all "high value detainees" have been transferred there since the United States Supreme Court's ruling in Rasul v. Bush.  As of July 2012 the camp population stands at 168.

Celikgogus v. Rumsfeld
Several released Turkish captives have filed a lawsuit against the US for their detention -- Celikgogus v. Rumsfeld.

Turkish captives acknowledged by the DoD

|-
| 297 || Ibrahim Shafir Sen || || 2003-11-18 ||
 Released on 22 November 2003, before the 2004 CSR Tribunals were set up.
|-
| 298 || Salih Uyar || 2002-02-15 || 2005-04-18 ||
 Accused of owning a Casio F91W digital watch.
 Accused of claiming to study Arabic.
 Accused of claiming to have lost his passport while fleeing the American aerial bombardment of Afghanistan.
 Determined not to have been an enemy combatant after all.
|-
| 543 || Mahmud Nuri Mart || 2002-02-15 || 2004-03-31 ||
 Released on 1 April 2004, before the 2004 CSR Tribunals were set up.
|}

References

 
Detainees of the Guantanamo Bay detention camp
Lists of Guantanamo Bay detainees by nationality
Guantanamo
Guantanamo